Local elections were held in Marinduque on May 13, 2013, as part of the 2013 general election. Voters selected candidates for all local positions: a town mayor, vice mayor and town councilors, as well as members of the Sangguniang Panlalawigan, a vice-governor, a governor and a representative for the lone district of Marinduque in the House of Representatives.

In this election, a number of provincial-level officials sought reelection, including incumbent governor Carmencita Reyes and incumbent congressman Lord Allan Jay Velasco.

Background

Congressional election
Incumbent congressman Lord Allan Jay Velasco, who was first elected in the 2010 election, is running for a second term.  Although he ran under the Lakas–CMD ticket in 2010, for this election he is running under the National Unity Party (NUP).  His challenger is Regina Ongsiako Reyes, the daughter of incumbent governor Carmencita Reyes, running under the Liberal Party.

However, Reyes was ordered disqualified by the First Division of the Commission on Elections (Comelec) over her citizenship status.  In its ruling, the Comelec cited the Citizenship Retention and Re-acquisition Act of 2003, claiming that Reyes was still an American citizen and she had failed to renounce her citizenship.  In addition, the ruling notes that Reyes did not submit sufficient evidence that she had been resident in Marinduque for at least one year, citing documents which point to her term as Provincial Administrator.  The ruling was affirmed by the Comelec en banc on May 14, 2013. But Commission on Election Chairman Sixto Brillantes in his dissenting opinion pointed that the evidence presented by Velasco's camp is a double hearsay and inadmissible since it was never sworn nor authenticated by the issuing officer and it was taken in an internet blog of unknown blogger.

Despite this, Reyes continued to sit as representative of Marinduque, with the Reyes camp claiming that it is the House of Representatives Electoral Tribunal (HRET), and not the Comelec or the Supreme Court, that should have jurisdiction over the case. On September 11, 2014, Gabriela Representative Luzviminda Ilagan said that the House of Representatives Electoral Tribunal voting 4-3 finally decided that they (HRET members) will uphold the exclusivity of jurisdiction over any protest or contest in the result of election of any House of Representatives members. With this development, the Commission's and the Supreme Court's respective decisions will be no longer in effect. Thus, Representative Regina Ongsiako Reyes was the seating Congresswoman of the Lone District of Marinduque but did not finish her 3-year term as she was later removed from her post and replaced by Velasco in February 2016.

Gubernatorial election
Incumbent governor Carmencita Reyes is running for a second term, having assumed the governorship after defeating then-incumbent Jose Antonio Carrion in the 2010 election, alongside her running mate, vice governor Antonio Uy Jr.  Although she was a guest candidate of the Liberal Party the previous election, having run as a member of the party-list group Bigkis Pinoy, for this election she is running as the Liberal Party candidate.  Reyes' running mate is doctor Romulo Bacorro.

Uy has since left the Liberal Party and has decided to run for governor under the NUP, the party of Congressman Velasco.  However, he does not have a running mate; instead, the NUP is endorsing Melecio Go of the Nacionalista Party for the position of vice governor.  Go is currently a member of the Sangguniang Panlalawigan for the province's first district, and was elected in 2010 as an independent.

Carrion was seeking to retake his seat after losing the previous election to Reyes.  Though he ran under the Lakas–CMD ticket in 2010, for this election he is running under the banner of the Nationalist People's Coalition. His running mate is Jose Alvarez, who previously sat as a member of the Sangguniang Panlalawigan for the province's first district.

Results

Provincial elections
Parties are as stated in their certificate of candidacies.

Gubernatorial election
Carmencita Reyes is the incumbent.

Vice gubernatorial election
Incumbent Antonio Uy Jr. is running for governor

Congressional election
Lord Allan Jay Velasco is the incumbent.

 
 
 
 

Despite being disqualified by the Comelec en banc, Regina Ongsiako Reyes was proclaimed anyway by the Provincial Board of Canvassers on May 15, 2013, although the camp of Lord Allan Jay Velasco attempted to stop the proclamation.  Edwin Villa, the provincial election supervisor and head of Marinduque's Provincial Board of Canvassers, has since been replaced by Val Mendoza, the provincial election supervisor of Romblon, although it is unclear whether Mendoza assumed the position.  Villa has since gone into hiding.

Provincial Board elections

1st District

Municipality: Boac, Mogpog, Gasan

|colspan=5 bgcolor=black|

2nd District
Municipality: Sta. Cruz, Torrijos, Buenavista

|colspan=5 bgcolor=black|

Municipal elections

Parties are as stated in their certificate of candidacies.

Boac
Roberto Madla is the incumbent.

Dante Marquez is the incumbent.

Mogpog
Senen Livelo Jr. is the incumbent.

Incumbent vice-mayor Sebastian Mandalihan is term limited and running for provincial board membership.

Gasan
Victoria L. Lim is the incumbent.

Incumbent vice-mayor Servillano M. Balitaan is term-limited and is running for municipal councilor.

Sta. Cruz
Percival Morales is the incumbent.

Ishmael Lim is the incumbent.

Torrijos
Gil Briones is the incumbent.

Roberto Macdon is the incumbent.

Buenavista
Incumbent Russel S. Madrigal is running unopposed.

Incumbent Montano Saguid is running unoppposed.

References

External links
 Official Candidates of the Province of the Marinduque
 Office Website of the Province of Marinduque

2013 Philippine local elections
2013